Andrey Tereshin (born 15 December 1982) is a male high jumper from Russia.

His personal best is 2.34 metres, though he has jumped 2.36 metres indoor in February 2006 in Moscow.

Achievements

References

External links 
 

1982 births
Living people
Russian male high jumpers
Competitors at the 2003 Summer Universiade